Fornelos may refer to:

Places

Portugal
 Fornelos (Barcelos), a civil parish in the municipality of Barcelos
 Fornelos (Cinfães), a civil parish in the municipality of Cinfães
 Fornelos (Fafe), a civil parish in the municipality of Fafe
 Fornelos (Ponte de Lima), a civil parish in the municipality of Ponte de Lima
 Fornelos (Santa Marta de Penaguião), a civil parish in the municipality of Santa Marta de Penaguião